The Aldwych bus bombing occurred on 18 February 1996 in Aldwych, central London, England. Provisional Irish Republican Army (IRA) volunteer Edward O'Brien was carrying a bomb on a bus when it detonated prematurely, killing him and injuring eight other people.

Background
The bus bombing occurred nine days after the Docklands bombing in east London, which marked the end of the IRA's ceasefire and the resumption of its armed campaign in England. On 16 February, an IRA bomb planted in a telephone box on Charing Cross Road, near Leicester Square tube station, was destroyed by a police remote-controlled robot after a telephone warning.

Bombing
At 10:38 pm on 18 February 1996, an improvised explosive device being carried by IRA member Edward O'Brien detonated prematurely on a WLT990, a Leyland Titan operating on route 171 in Aldwych, in the West End of London, England. The 2 kg (4 lb) Semtex bomb detonated as he sat near the door of the bus.

The bomb killed O'Brien instantly and injured people both inside and outside the bus, including the driver, who was permanently deafened. The victims were brought to St Thomas's Hospital and University College Hospital. Three of them were in two cars in front of the bus at the time. The blast could be heard five miles away. Police said they received no warning about the bomb. The attack forced the closure of Charing Cross railway station.

Investigation
It was initially reported by some media that three people were killed, but it then became clear that only the perpetrator was killed.

A subsequent police search of the London address of O'Brien discovered 15 kg (30 lb) of Semtex, 20 timers, four detonators and ammunition for a 9 mm Walther revolver, along with an incendiary device. The Walther pistol was discovered on him after his death. The police said they were also almost certain that O'Brien was the person who planted the telephone box bomb three days before the bus bombing.

Another Irishman, Brendan Woolhead, who was in the area at the time of the explosion and suffered a fractured skull, was briefly accused of involvement. His name was cleared and he subsequently won around £200,000 in damages for libel. Woolhead died in October 1996 due to drug detoxification treatment for addiction to heroin.

Later events
In February 2021, in Dáil Éireann, the Tánaiste criticised Sinn Féin for organising a commemoration for O'Brien. The commemoration was organised by Wexford Sinn Féin councillor Fionntán Ó Súilleabháin, and was cancelled on 19 February 2021, "at the request of the family, due to significant online abuse targeting the family".

See also
7 July 2005 London bombings

References

1996 in London
1996 road incidents
1990s in the City of Westminster
1990s road incidents in Europe
Bus bombing
Bus bombings in Europe
Bus incidents in England
Crime in Westminster
February 1996 crimes
February 1996 events in the United Kingdom
Improvised explosive device bombings in 1996
Provisional IRA bombings in London
Terrorist incidents against transport in the United Kingdom
Terrorist incidents in London in the 1990s
Terrorist incidents in the United Kingdom in 1996